Alexander Elliot Davidson Lillico (5 September 1905 – 1 November 1994) was an Australian politician. He was an independent member of the Tasmanian Legislative Council for the seat of Meander from 1943 to 1958 and a Liberal Party of Australia member of the Australian Senate from 1958 to 1974.

Early life
Lillico was born in Penguin, Tasmania, the son of state MP Alexander Lillico, and educated at Don State School and Devonport High School, with two terms boarding at Scotch College, Melbourne. He began farming after leaving school and acquired property at Wilmot. He was a member of the Kentish Council from 1934 until 1960 and became its youngest ever warden in 1936 at the age of 30.

Politics
In 1943 he was elected to the Tasmanian Legislative Council for Meander. In 1958, he left the Assembly to successfully contest the Australian Senate as a Liberal candidate for Tasmania. He retired in 1974. Lillico died in 1994.

Personal life
Lillico married Gladys Mayo in 1928, with whom he had three children. He was widowed in 1987 and died in Deloraine, Tasmania, on 1 November 1994. His great-nephew Mark Baker was elected to the House of Representatives in 2004.

References

 

Liberal Party of Australia members of the Parliament of Australia
Members of the Australian Senate for Tasmania
Members of the Australian Senate
Members of the Tasmanian Legislative Council
1905 births
1994 deaths
Liberal Party of Australia members of the Parliament of Tasmania
20th-century Australian politicians
People from Penguin, Tasmania
Australian farmers